Clea Shearer is an American entrepreneur, co-founder of the home organization company, The Home Edit, and co-host of the Netflix series, Get Organized with The Home Edit.<ref name="house beautiful">{{cite web |url=https://www.housebeautiful.com/lifestyle/a39324806/the-home-edits-get-organized-season-2-netflix/ |title=Everything You Need to Know About "Get Organized with The Home Edit" Season 2' |website=House Beautiful |accessdate=April 1, 2021}}</ref> Shearer attended the Parsons School of Design in New York City and is the co-author of the New York Times bestseller books, The Home Edit: A Guide to Organizing and Realizing Your House Goals and The Home Edit Life: The No-Guilt Guide to Owning What You Want and Organizing Everything''.

Career
Shearer met her business partner, Joanna Teplin, in 2015, and within hours of first meeting, the two began building their business, deciding on a name, setting up their website, domain, and social media handles, designing their logo and filling out paperwork. In January 2022, Walmart announced it was teaming up with Shearer and Teplin for a new product line of organizational tools that were easy to use and tied to specific rooms. Shearer stated that one of their biggest goals at The Home Edit is "making sure we democratize organization as much as possible."

On February 23, 2022, it was announced that Reese Witherspoon's media company, Hello Sunshine, had acquired The Home Edit.

Personal life
Shearer is married to photographer, John Shearer. The couple lives in Nashville with their two children, daughter, Stella Blue, and son, Sutton Gray.

On April 7, 2022, Shearer announced she had breast cancer and was undergoing a double mastectomy.

References

External links
 
 The Home Edit site

1982 births
American women company founders
American women in business
Businesspeople from California
Living people
People from Los Angeles
Parsons School of Design alumni